Kristian Bjørnsen (born 10 January 1989) is a Norwegian handball player for Aalborg Håndbold and the Norwegian national team.

His younger sister, Line Bjørnsen was also a professional handballer.

Individual awards
All-Star Right Wing of the World Championship: 2017

References

External links
 
 
 Kristian Bjørnsen at the Norwegian Handball Federation 
 
 

1989 births
Living people
Norwegian male handball players
Sportspeople from Stavanger
Expatriate handball players
Norwegian expatriate sportspeople in Denmark
Norwegian expatriate sportspeople in Germany
Norwegian expatriate sportspeople in Sweden
IFK Kristianstad players
HSG Wetzlar players
Handball-Bundesliga players
Handball players at the 2020 Summer Olympics
Olympic handball players of Norway